The Escape of Prisoner 614 is a 2018 American Western comedy written and directed by Zach Golden and starring Ron Perlman, Martin Starr, Jake McDorman and George Sample III.

Cast
Ron Perlman
Martin Starr
Jake McDorman
George Sample III as Prisoner Andre
Sondra James
John Hickman
Michael Sirow

Reception
The film has  rating on Rotten Tomatoes.  Glenn Kenny of RogerEbert.com awarded the film two and a half stars.

Luke Y. Thompson of Forbes gave the film a positive review and wrote, "More of an absurdist comedy than an uproarious one, this mostly works because McDorman and Starr play things completely seriously."

Frank Scheck of The Hollywood Reporter gave the film a negative review and wrote, "this satirical, modern-day Western induces a few mild chuckles but mostly wastes the talents of its cast."

References

External links
 
 

American Western (genre) films
Saban Films films
2010s English-language films
2010s American films